Geeving is the debut studio album by Canadian electronicore band Abandon All Ships. It was released on October 5, 2010 on Universal Music Canada, Underground Operations, Rise Records, and Velocity Records. The album peaked at number 27 on the Canadian Hot 100, and number 16 on the Billboard Top Heatseekers chart.

The album's lead single, "Take One Last Breath", was released on June 29, 2010 for digital download. It managed to peak at number 5 on the Canadian Rock Charts and number 65 on the Canadian Pop Charts. A music video directed by Davin Black premiered on MTV's Headbangers Ball on August 24, 2010, and VH1 on August 27. The album's second single, "Megawacko 2.1", was released on August 24, 2010 for digital download, whilst the music video premiered on MuchMusic the same day. A B-side from the album, "Maria (I Like It Loud)", was available for free download online. It is the last album to feature Daniel and Andrew Paiano, and is the group's only album recorded as a six-piece until their reformation in 2016.

Track listing

Release history

Personnel
Credits for Geeving adapted from Allmusic.

Musicians 

Abandon All Ships
 Angelo Aita – unclean vocals, composer
 Martin Broda – clean vocals, bass guitar, composer
 Kyler Stephen Browne – lead guitar
 Andrew Paiano – rhythm guitar, bass guitar, drums, composer
 Daniel Paiano – drums, percussion, composer
 Sebastian Cassisi-Nunez – synthesizers, keyboards, programming, composer

Guest musicians
Jhevon Paris – guest vocals on track 2
Rody Walker – guest vocals on track 6
Lena Katina – guest vocals on track 7

Production 

Boris Renski – production
Anthony Calabretta – production, engineering, mixing
Mark Spicoluk – composer, production

João Carvalho – mastering
Sven Martin – engineering
Zachary Ramsey – photography
Andrew Paiano – mixing

References

2010 debut albums
Abandon All Ships albums
Universal Music Canada albums
Rise Records albums